Moovendar Munnetra Kazhagam is a Tamil political party in India, based amongst the Thevar caste. The party was founded by G.M. Premkumar Vandaiyar and the present president is G.M. Sreedhar Vandaiyar.

Performance
All India Anna Dravida Munnetra Kazhagam fielded Sreedhar Vandaiyar in the Thiruverumbur Loksabha Constituency during 2006 and he lost by a small margin to K.N. Sekaran.
.

2009 and 2011
Presently in 2011 MMK is in alliance with All India Anna Dravida Munnetra Kazhagam. In 2009 parliamentary election G.M. Sreedhar Vandaiyar made an alliance with DMK.

References

Political parties in Tamil Nadu
Political parties with year of establishment missing